Viktor Viktorovich Manakov (28 July 1960 – 12 May 2019) was a Russian cyclist. He won the Gold Medal in the Men's team pursuit at the 1980 Summer Olympics. At the 1983 Summer Universiade he won gold in the men's points race and silver in the men's individual pursuit.

References 

1960 births
2019 deaths
Cyclists at the 1980 Summer Olympics
Olympic cyclists of the Soviet Union
Olympic gold medalists for the Soviet Union
Soviet male cyclists
Olympic medalists in cycling
Medalists at the 1980 Summer Olympics
Universiade medalists in cycling
People from Leningrad Oblast
Russian track cyclists
Universiade gold medalists for the Soviet Union
Medalists at the 1983 Summer Universiade
Sportspeople from Leningrad Oblast